The Crucible is a 1914 American silent romantic drama film directed by Edwin S. Porter and Hugh Ford and released through Paramount Pictures. Based on a novel of the same name by Mark Lee Luther (1872–1951), the film stars Marguerite Clark and Harold Lockwood. The film is now presumed lost.

Plot
As described in a film magazine, Jean (Clark) is brought up as a boy by her father and, after Mr. Fenshaw dies, her boyish manner offends her mother and sisters. Jean is nagged and punished until one day she picks up a sickle and, without really intending to, cuts her sister's hand. She is sent to a reformatory. She later meets Craig Atwood (Lockwood), an artist in the woods, and goes through a series of trials to prove she is worthy of the love of her friend, the painter.

Please Note: The film production does not relate to Arthur Miller's play, The Crucible.

Cast
 Marguerite Clark as Jean
 Harold Lockwood as Craig Atwood
 Justina Johnstone as Amelia 
 Lucy Palmer as Mrs. Fanshaw
 Barbara Winthrop as Miss Van Ostyn
 Helen Hall as Stella Wilkes
 Blanche Fisher as Amy
 Clifford Grey as Harry 
 Mrs. Mathilde Brundage

References

External links

The Crucible entry in the AFI Catalog of Feature Films

1914 films
1914 romantic drama films
American romantic drama films
American silent feature films
American black-and-white films
Films based on American novels
Films directed by Edwin S. Porter
Films directed by Hugh Ford
Films shot in New York City
Lost American films
Paramount Pictures films
1914 lost films
Lost romantic drama films
1910s American films
Silent romantic drama films
Silent American drama films
1910s English-language films